Narathip Phanprom (born November 12, 1978) is a Thai retired professional footballer who played as a goalkeeper He is the currently goalkeeper coach Thai League 1 club Muangthong United

In 2009 Phanprom was a losing finalist in the Singapore Cup with Bangkok Glass.

Honours
Bangkok Glass
 Queen's Cup: 2010
 Singapore Cup: 2010

External links
 

1978 births
Living people
Naratip Phanprom
Naratip Phanprom
Association football goalkeepers
Naratip Phanprom
Naratip Phanprom
Naratip Phanprom
Naratip Phanprom
Naratip Phanprom
Naratip Phanprom
Naratip Phanprom
Naratip Phanprom
Naratip Phanprom